Samuela Davetawalu is a Fijian former professional rugby league footballer who represented Fiji at the 1995 World Cup.

Playing career
Davetawalu was selected for the Fijian squad for the 1995 World Cup. He played in one match, starting in the second row, against Australia.

References

Living people
Fijian rugby league players
Fiji national rugby league team players
I-Taukei Fijian people
Rugby league second-rows
Year of birth missing (living people)